Black Saturday was a particularly dark, stormy Saturday in Scotland, on 4 August 1621. Many regarded the foul weather as a judgment of Heaven against the Five Articles of Perth then passed in the Scots Parliament tending to establish Episcopacy.

Many suicides were recorded on this day, as some saw the foul weather as a preparatory for Armageddon.

See also
 Divine retribution
 Five Articles of Perth

Sources and notes

1621 in Scotland
History of the Church of Scotland
Parliament of Scotland
1621 in politics
Apocalypticism
Religion and politics
1621 in Christianity
Scottish mythology
Religion and law
Suicides in Scotland

Church of Scotland